The Liechtenstein Ice Hockey Federation is the governing body of ice and inline hockey in Liechtenstein.

External links
 International Ice Hockey Federation
 Liechtenstein Ice Hockey Federation

Ice hockey governing bodies in Europe
Ice hockey in Liechtenstein
International Ice Hockey Federation members